Główczyn may refer to the following places:
Główczyn, Kuyavian-Pomeranian Voivodeship (north-central Poland)
Główczyn, Grójec County in Masovian Voivodeship (east-central Poland)
Główczyn, Płock County in Masovian Voivodeship (east-central Poland)
Główczyn, Greater Poland Voivodeship (west-central Poland)